Dixeia capricornus, the Capricorn white, is a butterfly in the family Pieridae. It is found in Ivory Coast, Ghana, Benin, Nigeria, Cameroon, Gabon, the Republic of the Congo and Angola. The habitat consists of forests.

Subspecies
Dixeia capricornus capricornus (eastern Ivory Coast, Ghana, Benin, southern Nigeria, western and central Cameroon)
Dixeia capricornus falkensteinii (Dewitz, 1879) (southern Cameroon, Gabon, Congo, Angola)

References

Seitz, A. Die Gross-Schmetterlinge der Erde 13: Die Afrikanischen Tagfalter. Plate XIII 14

Butterflies described in 1871
Pierini
Butterflies of Africa
Taxa named by Christopher Ward (entomologist)